Aleksa Ilić (born September 17, 1996) is a Montenegrin professional basketball player for Budućnost VOLI of the ABA League and the Montenegrin League.

He signed a two-year contract extension with the team on May 14, 2020.

References

External links
 Aleksa Ilić at aba-liga.com
 Aleksa Ilić at eurobasket.com
 Aleksa Ilić at fiba.com
 Aleksa Ilić at euroleague.net

1996 births
Living people
ABA League players
KK Budućnost players
KK Sutjeska players
KK Studentski centar playersa
Montenegrin men's basketball players
Sportspeople from Nikšić
Power forwards (basketball)